Railway electrification systems using alternating current (AC) at  are used worldwide, especially for high-speed rail. It is usually supplied at the standard utility frequency (typically 50 or 60Hz), which simplifies traction substations. The development of 25kV AC electrification is closely connected with that of successfully using utility frequency.

This electrification is ideal for railways that cover long distances or carry heavy traffic. After some experimentation before World War II in Hungary and in the Black Forest in Germany, it came into widespread use in the 1950s.

One of the reasons why it was not introduced earlier was the lack of suitable small and lightweight control and rectification equipment before the development of solid-state rectifiers and related technology. Another reason was the increased clearance distances required where it ran under bridges and in tunnels, which would have required major civil engineering in order to provide the increased clearance to live parts.

Railways using older, lower-capacity direct current systems have introduced or are introducing  AC instead of  DC/ DC for their new high-speed lines.

History
The first successful operational and regular use of a utility frequency system dates back to 1931, tests having run since 1922. The first electrified line for testing was Budapest–Dunakeszi–Alag. The first fully electrified line was Budapest–Győr–Hegyeshalom (part of the Budapest–Vienna line). Although Kandó's solution showed a way for the future, railway operators outside of Hungary showed a lack of interest in the design.

The first railway to use this system was completed in 1936 by the Deutsche Reichsbahn who electrified part of the Höllentalbahn between Freiburg and Neustadt installing a 20kV50 Hz AC system. This part of Germany was in the French zone of occupation after 1945. As a result of examining the German system in 1951 the SNCF electrified the line between Aix-les-Bains and La Roche-sur-Foron in southern France, initially at the same 20kV but converted to 25kV in 1953. The 25kV system was then adopted as standard in France, but since substantial amounts of mileage south of Paris had already been electrified at 1.5kV DC, SNCF also continued some major new DC electrification projects, until dual-voltage locomotives were developed in the 1960s.

The main reason why electrification using utility frequency had not been widely adopted before was the lack of reliability of mercury-arc-type rectifiers that could fit on the train. This in turn related to the requirement to use DC series motors, which required the current to be converted from AC to DC and for that a rectifier is needed. Until the early 1950s, mercury-arc rectifiers were difficult to operate even in ideal conditions and were therefore unsuitable for use in railway locomotives.

It was possible to use AC motors (and some railways did, with varying success), but they have had less than ideal characteristics for traction purposes. This is because control of speed is difficult without varying the frequency and reliance on voltage to control speed gives a torque at any given speed that is not ideal. This is why DC series motors were the most common choice for traction purposes until the 1990s, as they can be controlled by voltage, and have an almost ideal torque vs speed characteristic. 

In the 1990s, high-speed trains began to use lighter, lower-maintenance three-phase AC induction motors. The N700 Shinkansen uses a three-level converter to convert  single-phase AC to  AC (via transformer) to  DC (via phase-controlled rectifier with thyristor) to a maximum  three-phase AC (via a variable voltage, variable frequency inverter using IGBTs with pulse-width modulation) to run the motors. The system works in reverse for regenerative braking.

For a given power level, a higher voltage allows for a lower current and usually better efficiency at the greater cost for high-voltage equipment. It was found that  was an optimal point, where a higher voltage would still improve efficiency but not by a significant amount in relation to the higher costs incurred by the need for larger insulators and greater clearance from structures.

To avoid short circuits, the high voltage must be protected from moisture. Weather events, such as "the wrong type of snow", have caused failures in the past. An example of atmospheric causes occurred in December 2009, when four Eurostar trains broke down inside the Channel Tunnel.

Distribution
Electric power for  AC electrification is usually taken directly from the three-phase transmission system. This is then fed, sometimes several kilometres away, to a railway feeder station located beside the tracks. Since only two phases of the high-voltage supply are used, phase imbalance is corrected by connecting each feeder station to a different combination of phases. To avoid the train pantograph bridging together two feeder stations which may be out-of-phase with each other, neutral sections are provided between sections fed from different feeder stations. SVCs are used for load balancing and voltage control. 

In some cases dedicated single-phase AC power lines were built to substations with single phase AC transformers. Such lines were built to supply the French TGV.

Standardisation
Railway electrification using ,  AC has become an international standard. There are two main standards that define the voltages of the system:

EN50163:2004+A1:2007 - "Railway applications. Supply voltages of traction systems"
IEC60850 - "Railway Applications. Supply voltages of traction systems"

The permissible range of voltages allowed are as stated in the above standards and take into account the number of trains drawing current and their distance from the substation.

This system is now part of the European Union's Trans-European railway interoperability standards (1996/48/EC "Interoperability of the Trans-European high-speed rail system" and 2001/16/EC "Interoperability of the Trans-European Conventional rail system").

Variations
Systems based on this standard but with some variations have been used.

25 kV AC at 60 Hz

In Canada on the Deux-Montagnes line of the Montreal Metropolitan transportation Agency.
In Japan on the Tokaido, Sanyo and Kyushu Shinkansen lines (using  gauge).
In South Korea on the Korail network.
In Taiwan on the Taiwan High Speed Rail line (using  gauge) and on Taiwan Railway Administration's electrified lines (using  gauge).
In the United States on newer electrified portions of the Northeast Corridor (i.e. the New Haven-Boston segment) intercity passenger lines, New Jersey Transit commuter lines, Denver RTD Commuter Rail and select isolated short lines. In the San Francisco Bay Area, Caltrain is currently undergoing an electrification project, to be completed in the mid-2020s.

20 kV AC at 50 or 60 Hz
In Japan, this is used on existing railway lines in Tohoku Region, Hokuriku Region, Hokkaido and Kyushu, of which Hokuriku and Kyushu are at 60Hz.

12.5 kV AC at 60 Hz
Examples are:
Metro-North Railroad's New Haven Line from Pelham, NY to New Haven, CT (Since 1985; previously 11kV 25Hz).

12 kV at 25 Hz 
 New Jersey Transit's North Jersey Coast Line from Matawan, NJ to Long Branch, NJ (1988–2002; changed to 25kV 60Hz).
 Amtrak
SEPTA - Both ex-Reading Rail and ex-Pennsylvania Rail sides.

6.25 kV AC
Early 50Hz AC railway electrification in the United Kingdom was planned to use sections at  where there was limited clearance under bridges and in tunnels.

The research was done using a steam engine beneath a bridge at Crewe.  A section of  overhead line was gradually brought closer to the earthed metalwork of the bridge whilst being subjected to steam from the locomotive's chimney. The distance at which a flashover occurred was measured and this was used as a basis from which new clearances between overhead equipment and structures were derived.

50 kV AC
Such lines are usually isolated from other lines to avoid complications from interrunning. Examples are:
The Sishen–Saldanha iron ore railway.
The Deseret Power Railway which was an isolated coal railway.
The now closed Black Mesa and Lake Powell Railroad which was also an isolated coal railway.
The now closed Tumbler Ridge Subdivision of BC Rail.

2 × 25 kV autotransformer system

The 2 × 25kV autotransformer system is a split-phase electric power system which supplies 25kV power to the trains, but transmits power at 50kV to reduce energy losses.  It should not be confused with the 50kV system. In this system, the current is mainly carried between the overhead line and a feeder transmission line instead of the rail. The overhead line (3) and feeder (5) are on opposite phases so the voltage between them is 50kV, while the voltage between the overhead line (3) and the running rails (4) remains at 25kV.  Periodic autotransformers (9) divert the return current from the neutral rail, step it up, and send it along the feeder line.  This system is used by Indian Railways, Russian Railways, Italian High Speed Railways, UK High Speed 1, most of the West Coast Main Line and Crossrail, with some parts of older lines being gradually converted, French lines (LGV lines and some other lines), most Spanish high-speed rail lines, Amtrak and some of the Finnish and Hungarian lines.

Boosted voltage
For TGV world speed record runs in France the voltage was temporarily boosted, to 29.5kV and 31kV at different times.

25 kV on broad gauge lines 

 In Argentina on the Roca Line (using  gauge).
 In Australia:
 Adelaide: part of the suburban network.
 Commonwealth of Independent States: parts of the network.
 Finland: see rail transport in Finland.
 India: see rail transport in India and Central Organisation for Railway Electrification.
 Portugal: see list of railway lines in Portugal.

25 kV on narrow gauge lines 
In Australia:
Perth: entire suburban network, see Transperth Train Operations.
Queensland: see rail electrification in Queensland.
In Malaysia: see rail transport in Malaysia.
In New Zealand: see North Island Main Trunk and Auckland railway electrification.
In South Africa: see rail transport in South Africa (25 and  ).
In Taiwan: see rail transport in Taiwan.
In Tunisia: see rail transport in Tunisia.

Other voltages on 50 Hz electrification
In France, Mont Blanc Tramway and Chemin de fer du Montenvers: 
In Germany, Hambachbahn and Nord-Süd-Bahn:

Multi-system locomotives and trains 

Trains that can operate on more than one voltage, say 3kV/25kV, are established technologies.  Some locomotives in Europe are capable of using four different voltage standards.

See also 
 15 kV AC railway electrification
 List of railway electrification systems
 Rotary phase converter

References

Further reading 
 Keenor, Garry. Overhead line electrification for railways. 
 
 
 
 
 
 
 
 

 
Electric rail transport